Oberburg may refer to:

 Oberburg, Bern, a municipality in Switzerland
 Gornji Grad, Gornji Grad (German: Oberburg), a town in Slovenia
 Oberburg, Kobern, a hill castle in Rhineland-Palatinate, Germany

See also

 Inner bailey, or inner ward, the strongly fortified enclosure at the heart of a medieval castle
 Obere Burg, a castle ruin in Schellenberg, Liechtenstein
 Obernburg, a town in Bavaria, Germany